Dixon Drums is a drum and drum hardware manufacturer based in Taipei, Taiwan, founded in 1979. They are distributed in the United States by St. Louis Music.

Grammy Award winning drummer Gregg Bissonette endorses Dixon drums..

Drum lines
In 2011, Dixon launched its current drum set line up consisting of Riot, Spark, Fuse, Blaze and Artisan.

References

Manufacturing companies based in Taipei
Companies established in 1979 
Musical instrument manufacturing companies of Taiwan
Percussion instrument manufacturing companies
Taiwanese brands